The Men's singles competition at the 2020 FIL World Luge Championships was held on 16 February 2020.

Results
The first run was held at 13:19 and the second run at 15:24.

References

Men's singles